Oritia González-Urbie (born December 19, 1987 in Comodoro Rivadavia, Chubut) is a judoka from Argentina.

She was born in Comodoro Rivadavia but trains in Buenos Aires. It is a problem for sportsmen from cities other than Buenos Aires to find some financing for doing a sport that they like. She is sponsored by Ricardo Fueyo and Walter Ñonquepán, who provide her living in capital city and training in CeNARD.

She is still waiting for big medal. She actually has some bronzes from continental level.

Achievements

References

External links
 
 

Living people
Argentine female judoka
1987 births
Judoka at the 2011 Pan American Games
South American Games bronze medalists for Argentina
South American Games medalists in judo
Competitors at the 2010 South American Games
Pan American Games competitors for Argentina
20th-century Argentine women
21st-century Argentine women